This is a list of individuals who held the post of Kapitan Cina, a government position that existed in colonial Indonesia, Malaysia and Singapore. The role came with vastly varying degrees of power, depending on historical and local circumstances: from near-sovereign authority with legal, political and military powers to an honorary title for a community leader.

Kapitan Cina in Hirado, Japan
 Kapitan Cina Li Dan

Kapitan Cina in the Residency of Batavia (Greater Jakarta, Indonesia)

Hoofden der Chinezen of Batavia (Senior Heads and Chairmen of the Kong Koan)
 1619–1636: Kapitein Souw Beng Kong (formerly Kapitan Cina of Banten)
 1636-1645: Kapitein Lim Lak Ko
 1645-1663: Kapitein Phoa Beng Gan
 1663-1666: Kapitein Gan Djie
 1666-1678: Nyai Kapitein Gan Djie
 1678-1685: Kapitein Tjoa Hoan Giok
 1736-1740: Kapitein Nie Hoe Kong
 1791-1800: Kapitein Oey Bian Kong
 1800-1809: Kapitein Gouw Tjang Sie
 1809-1812: Kapitein Tan Peng Long 
 1811-1817: Kapitein Tan Jap Long
 1817-1822: Kapitein Lie Tiauw Ko
 1822-1829: Kapitein Ko Tian Tjong
 1829-1865: Majoor Tan Eng Goan
 1865-1879: Majoor Tan Tjoen Tiat
 1879-1895: Majoor Lie Tjoe Hong
 1896-1907: Majoor Tio Tek Ho
 1910–1945: Majoor Khouw Kim An

Other Chinese Officers in Batavia
 Luitenant Souw Tok Soen
 Luitenant Souw Siauw Tjong
 Luitenant Souw Siauw Keng

Luitenants of Bekasi, Residency of Batavia
 1854-1882: Lauw Tek Lok, Luitenant der Chinezen
 xxxx-xxxx: Tan Kang Ie, Luitenant der Chinezen
 xxxx-xxxx: Han Oen Lee, Luitenant der Chinezen

Hoofden der Chinezen of Buitenzorg (present day Bogor), Residency of Batavia
 Kapitein Tan Oe Ko (1829-1860)
 Kapitein Tan Soey Tiong (1860-1866)
 Kapitein Phoa Tjeng Tjoan (1866-1878)
 Kapitein Tan Kong Tjan (1869-1882)
 Kapitein Tan Goan Piauw (1878-1883)
 Kapitan Tan Goan Pouw (1883-1891)
 Kapitein Khouw Kim Tjiang (1891-1902)
 Kapitein Oey Ban Tjie (1903-1911)
 Kapitein Tan Tjoen Tjiang (1912-1913)

Other Chinese Officers in Buitenzorg, Residency of Batavia
 Luitenant Thio Tian Soe (1869-1879)
 Luitenant Tan Keng Boen (1878-1879)
 Luitenant Thio Sian Lok (1879-1886)
 Luitenant Thio Sian Tjiang (1883-1886)
 Luitenant Khouw Oen Tek (1886-1889)
 Luitenant Tan Tjoen Hong (1891-1893)
 Luitenant Tan Tjoen Kiat (1892-1898)
 Luitenant Tan Tjoen Kie (1893-1895)
 Luitenant Thung Tjoen Ho (1895-1911)
 Luitenant Thung Tjeng Ho (1910-1913)
 Luitenant Lie Tjoe Tjin (1911-1913)
 Luitenant Lie Beng Hok (1912-1913)
 Luitenant Tan Hong Joe (1913-1919)
 Luitenant Tan Hong Tay (1913-1926)
 Luitenant Tan Tjoen Lien (1914-1919)
 Luitenant Tan Hong Yoe (1925-1934)
 Luitenant Tjan Soen Hay (1926-1934)

Hoofden der Chinezen of Tangerang, Residency of Batavia
 1868-1877: Oey Tjong Piauw, Kapitein der Chinezen
 1877-1884: Lim Tjong Hien, Kapitein der Chinezen
 1884-1897: Oey Khe Tay, Kapitein der Chinezen (died in office)
 1899-1907: Oey Giok Koen, Kapitein der Chinezen
 1907-1916: Oey Djie San, Kapitein der Chinezen 
 1928-1934: Oey Kiat Tjin, Kapitein der Chinezen (died in office)

Other Chinese Officers in Tangerang, Residency of Batavia
 18xx-1887: Lim Mo Gie, Luitenant der Chinezen
 1877-1885: Tan Tiang Po, Luitenant der Chinezen
 1884-1897: Souw Siauw Keng, Luitenant der Chinezen
 1899-1901: Lie Hin Liang, Luitenant der Chinezen
 18xx-1907: Ang Kong Pan, Luitenant der Chinezen
 18xx-1907: Kho Po Tjoan, Luitenant der Chinezen

Kapitan Cina in the rest of Indonesia

Hoofden der Chinezen of Bandung
 Luitenant Oei Boen Hoen
 Luitenant Tan Haij Liong
 Kapitein Tan Joen Liong

Hoofden der Chinezen of Batang
 Kapitein Souw Ban An

Hoofden der Chinezen of Manado
 Kapitein The Tjien Tjo
 Kapitein Sie Sieuw
 Kapitein Ong Tjeng Hie
 Kapitein Lie Tjeng Lok 
 Kapitein Tan Tjin Bie
 Kapitein Oei Pek Jong 
 Kapitein Tjia Pak Liem
 Kapitein Lie Goan Oan 
 Kapitein Tjia Goan Tjong
 Luitenant Que Ing Hie
 Luitenant Ong Bondjie
 Luitenant Tan Bian Loe
 Luitenant Tjoa Jaoe Hoei
 Luitenant Pauw Djoe

Luitenants of Gorontalo
 Luitenant Liem Peng Boen (林炳文)
 Luitenant Liem Kiem Thae (林金逮)
 Luitenant Ong Teng Hoen

Hoofden der Chinezen of Medan
 1874-1885 Tjioe Tjoe Jen 
 1881-1887 Oen Gan The (溫颜鄭)
 1890-1911 Majoor Tjong Yong Hian (张爵干)
 1911-1921 Majoor Tjong A Fie (张耀轩)
 1922-1950 Khoe Tjin Tek

Hoofden der Chinezen of Surabaya
 1700s - 1778: Kapitein Han Bwee Kong
 1778 - 1827: Majoor Han Chan Piet
 1888 - 1894: Majoor The Toan Tjiak
 1894 - 1900s: Majoor Tie Ing Tjay
 1904 - 1906: Majoor Tan Sing Tian (陳成典)
 1907 - 1913: Majoor The Toan Ing
 1914 - 1924: Majoor Han Tjiong Khing

Kapitan Cina in Malaysia

Kapitans of Sarawak
 Kapitan China Ong Tiang Swee OBE

Kapitans of Kuala Lumpur

Yap Ah Loy was a Kapitan of Kuala Lumpur and is considered the founder of the city. The title was abolished in 1902, when Yap Kwan Seng died.

 1858–1861: Hew Siew (丘秀)
 1862–1868: Liu Ngim Kong (刘壬光)
 1868–1885: Yap Ah Loy (叶亚来)
 1885–1889: Yap Ah Shak (叶致英)
 1889–1902: Yap Kwan Seng (叶观盛)

Kapitans of Johor / Major China of Johor
 1845–1857: Tan Kee Soon (Kapitan of Tebrau) 
 1859–1869: Tan Cheng Hung (Kapitan of Tebrau) 
 1869–18xx: Seah Tee Heng (Kapitan of Sekudai)
 1870–1875: Tan Hiok Nee (Major China)
 1xxx–1xxx: Lim Ah Siang (林亞相)
 1xxx–1917: Lin Jin He

Kapitans of Kuala Terengganu
 1736–1820 Teo Tioh Eng
 1782–17xx Kow Geok Seng
 1798–1847 Lim Eng Huat
 1810–18xx Kow Teck Lee
 18xx–18xx Low Kian Tee
 18xx–1899 Wee Teck Siew
 1xxx–19xx Kow Swee Leng

Kapitans of Malacca
 1572–1617 Tay Hong Yong @ Tay Kie Ki (鄭甲)
 1614–1688 Li Wei King @ Li Koon Chang (李為經)
 1662–1708 Lee Chiang Hou @ Lee Chong Kian
 1643–1718 Chan Ki Lock @ Chan Lak Kua
 1725–1765 Chan Hian Kway @ Chan Kwang Hwee
 1703–1784 Tan Seng Yong
 1748–1794 Tan Ki Hou @ Tan Siang Lian
 1750–1802 Chua Su Cheong @ Chua Tok Ping
 1771–1882 Chan Yew Liang @ Chan Keng Sin

Kapitans of Penang
 1787–1826 Kapitan China Koh Lay Huan (辜禮歡) was Kapitan China of Kedah, and appointed the first Kapitan China of Penang
 1894–1908 Cheah Ching Hui (謝清輝)
 1908–1918 Cheah Yong Chong (謝榮宗)

Kapitans of Perak
 1830–18xx Tan Ah Hun (陳亞漢)
 1875–1900 Chung Keng Quee (鄭景貴)
 1875–1899 Chin Ah Yam @ Chin Seng Yam (陳亞炎) leader of the Ghee Hin during the Larut Wars
 1886–1906 Khaw Boo Aun @ Khaw Ewe Kuang (許武安)
 1930–1935 Chung Thye Phin (鄭大平) last Kapitan China of Perak and (British) Malaya

Kapitans Cina in Singapore

Kapitans Cina of Singapore
 Choa Chong Long
 Tan Tock Seng (acting)
 Tan Kim Ching

Other Kapitans in Singapore
 Tan Hiok Nee
 Oei Tiong Ham

Other Kapitans Cina
 Kapitein Lay Soen Hie, Kapitan of Pasar Baroe, Batavia (Jakarta)
Tan Ah Hun, the first Capitan China of Perak circa 1850s, father of Tan Seng Poh and father-in-law of Seah Eu Chin
Shing Kap, Capitan China of Sungei Ujong, and a Hai San headman
Choa Mah Soo, Capitan China of Klias and Mempakul (circa 1869)
Chua Su Cheong Capitan China of Dutch Malacca and father of Choa Chong Long
Chan Yungqua, Capitan China of Malacca (18th century)
Ah Poh, Capitan China of Lipis
Seah Tye Heng, Capitan China of Sekudai, Johore
Lieu Chin-Fu, Capitan China of Pulai was the last Capitan China of Kelantan
Tan How Seng, Capitan China of Singapore
Li Kap or Li Kup or Lee Wei King, Capitan China of Dutch Malacca, founder of the Cheng Hoon Teng temple there and the person who donated Bukit China for use as a Chinese burial ground
 Wee Sin Hee, Capitan China of Terengganu
Tin Kap or Tay Kap, Capitan China of Portuguese Malacca, said to have been the only Capitan China appointed by the Portuguese
Baba Seng, Capitan China of Kedah in the 1820s
 Chan Ki Lock or Chan Kup, Capitan China of Dutch Malacca circa 1704
Khaw Boo Aun
 Dato' Chua Tuah Soon
 WEE, Hee Hoon (D: 17 March 1922 at 46 yrs of age, leaving a widow and seven children), Kapitan China of Bagan Si Api Api (Indonesia)
 OEY, Teng Kiang (Murdered 17 September 1924), Kapitan China of Palembang (Indonesia).
 KOH, Kim Hin (husband of Mrs Anne Tan-Koh who died at 79 yrs of age in 1966, and father of Bishop Roland Koh), Kapitan China of Sandakan (East Malaysia).
 OEI, Leong Tan, Kapitan China of Bengkalis.
 LEE, Lei Kam (李礽錦), Kapitan China of Perlis.
 ONG, Boon Pang, Kapitan China of Brunei.
 PANG, Boon Ting, Pehin Kapitan China Kornia Diraja of Brunei
 Tjoe Ten-Hien, Kapitein China of Koetaradja, Sumatra
 Tam Yong (father of towkay Tan Yee Man), Kapitan China of Seremban.
 Phang Tjong-Tjoen, Kapitan China of Belitoeng
 Lee Sam, Kapitan China of Seremban.
 LIEM, Ah Pat, Capitan China of Muntok was decorated by the Dutch Government in 1910.
 KHOO Cheow Teong, (Justice of the Peace and father of Khoo Sian Ewe), Kapitan China of Tanjungbalai, Asahan.
 Khoe Hock Cho, Kapitan China of Tanjungbalai, Asahan
 Hho Tsai Thoan, Kapitan China of Tanjungpura
 Kwee-Aan-Kie, Kapitan China of Ambarawa
 WEE, Chim Yean (Died 13 August 1926 leaving four sons and four daughters), Kapitan China of Bengkalis.
 KO, Kim Yeo, Kapitan China of Batavia.
 WEE, Boon Teng (Born in Singapore in 1864. Educated at Lye Fatt English School. Appointed Lieutenant China of Selat Panjang on the Sumatra east coast in 1890. Promoted to Capitan China in 1915 and awarded the Dutch colonial gold medal. Promoted to Majoor in 1925 prior to his retirement), Kapitan China of Selat Panjang.
 Go Hong Soen, Kapitan China of Rengat, Riau

References

Bibliography

Hwang, In-Won (2003). Personalized Politics: The Malaysian State Under Matahtir. Singapore: Institute of Southeast Asian Studies. 
Lohanda, Mona (1996). The Kapitan Cina of Batavia, 1837-1942. Jakarta: Djambatan. .
Ooi, Keat Gin (2004). Southeast Asia: A Historical Encyclopedia, From Angkor Wat to East Timor. ABC-CLIO.

External links
 Chinese Kapitans of Malacca

 
Political history of Malaysia
Chinese diaspora in Indonesia
Chinese diaspora in Malaysia
Chinese Indonesian culture
Positions of authority
Noble titles
Chinese-language titles
Lists of political office-holders in Indonesia